The YMCA of Metropolitan Chattanooga is the Young Men's Christian Association branch in the Chattanooga, Tennessee area.  It includes 8 branches and over 120 program sites in the Chattanooga area.  The YMCA of Metropolitan Chattanooga is a chapter of the national YMCA-USA.

In 2016, YMCA of Metropolitan Chattanooga served more than 250,000 meals to area youth through its feeding programs.

Branches 
The branches that make up the YMCA of Metropolitan Chattanooga are:
 Downtown Family YMCA
Hamilton Family YMCA
Cleveland Family YMCA
Healthy Living Center at North River
North Georgia Community YMCA
 J.A. Henry Family YMCA
 Y-CAP
 Camp Ocoee

References

External links 

Chattanooga
Men's organizations in the United States
Non-profit organizations based in Tennessee
Organizations based in Chattanooga, Tennessee
Youth organizations based in the United States